Earth Law Center (ELC) is a 501(c)(3) non-profit organization operating from Boulder, Colorado; Spokane, Washington, New York City and the San Francisco Bay Area. Members of the group believe that recognizing and implementing the rights of nature in law is necessary to begin to reverse what they regard as a trend of environmental degradation, as the current environmental laws have been unable to solve this.

Rights of Nature

Earth Law Center and partner groups around the world are involved in a movement to recognize the rights of nature. Earth Law Center asserts that the overarching legal system generally treats the natural world as property that can be exploited and degraded, rather than as an ecological partner with its rights to exist and thrive. They further assert that environmental regulations in turn accept this overarching system and assume that the environment will be protected if humans take from it a little less, and a little less quickly, but that this will simply slow, and never stop, environmental degradation. The rights of nature movement contends that the value and rights of the natural world arise from the fact of its existence. Several notable legal instruments incorporate nature's rights, including the 2008 Constitution of Ecuador, which recognizes the inalienable rights of ecosystems to exist and flourish and allows for citizens to enforce these rights, and Bolivia's Law of the Rights of Mother Earth and subsequent Framework Law on Mother Earth and Integral Development for Living Well, which recognize legal rights for Mother Earth.

Activities

Earth Law Center works to change the law to recognize and protect nature's rights. The organization does this by building a team of advocates for nature's rights at the local, state, national, and international levels.

ELC is a legal advocacy group focused on establishing Earth Law, including the rights of nature, through two key areas of activity: Legal and Outreach. 
  Legal work: Consists of securing biodiversity and ecosystem rights for rivers, coastal areas and Marine Protected Areas. 
 Outreach work: Focuses on advancing Earth Law education, “globalizing” the rights of nature, and mainstreaming Earth Law through creative forces.

1.	LEGAL PROGRAMS

ACHIEVING ECOSYSTEM RIGHTS FOR RIVERS AND OCEANS

Rivers
ELC has for years served as a leader in protecting the right of waterways to flow in California, primarily through application of the Clean Water Act.
The goal of ELC is to achieve fundamental rights for waterways, which will ensure their full protection and restoration to health. ELC is building off the success of other jurisdictions that have recently recognized personhood rights for rivers, including the Whanganui River in New Zealand, the Ganges and Yamuna Rivers in India, and the Atrato River in Colombia.

Oceans
The first Marine Protected Area (MPA) was established in 1903 by President Theodore Roosevelt. ELC is now aiming to incorporate fundamental rights into MPAs and other legal mechanisms. ELC strategies to ensure marine ecosystem rights include: 
 Securing marine ecosystem rights, through ordinances establishing fundamental legal rights;
 Ensuring that international treaty laws reflect the inherent rights of the ocean (such as through the Marine Biodiversity Treaty for the High Seas and Beyond, currently under negotiation); and
 Establishing a definition of “ocean health” which is based on an ocean's intrinsic rights and needs, and a new “ocean health index” based on this holistic definition.

SECURING LOCAL AND STATE LAWS
ELC has led to the passing in Santa Monica of the first West Coast rights of nature ordinance. Nearly three dozen cities in the U.S. have passed ordinances, and Mexico City has amended its constitution, recognizing the rights of nature and asserting communities’ rights to self-governance, a healthy environment and sustainable living. These victories will drive ELC's statewide rights of nature wins.

ELC strategies at the community level include: 
 Enforcing existing rights of nature laws, including in Santa Monica; 
 Creating new rights of nature laws in local communities and major coastal cities (e.g., San Francisco)
 Developing toolkits for allies to pass and implement their own rights of nature laws, then leading those allies to local victories.

2.	EDUCATION & OUTREACH PROGRAMS

ADVANCING EARTH LAW EDUCATION 
ELC develops and delivers an Earth Law course at law schools and universities in the U.S. and Canada, including Vermont Law School—the top environmental law school in the country. ELC strategies to advance education and outreach include: 
 Disseminating ELC's Earth Law course to law schools nationwide in order to expand the number of future lawyers that can advocate for and defend rights of nature laws; 
 Launching a secondary school projects
 Expanding rights of nature outreach, including social media, speaking engagements, university organizations and new rights of nature groups.

SECURING RIGHTS OF NATURE INTERNATIONALLY
ELC advances rights of nature within the United Nations and the International Union for the Conservation of Nature (IUCN). ELC ensured that advancement of nature's rights was included as part of the IUCN's 4-year work program, from 2016 to 2020. ELC also helped organize two International Rights of Nature Tribunals, which hear cases on nature's rights violations arising from across the globe. Already, countries such as Ecuador and Bolivia have codified rights of nature in their constitutions, and nature has seen numerous victories as a result, such as the restoration of the Vilcabamba River in Ecuador.

ELC strategies at the international level include: 
 Ensuring presentation and passage of the Universal Declaration on the Rights of Mother Earth (Rights of Nature) at a session of the UN General Assembly;
 Advancing rights of nature within the IUCN, including its World Commission on Environmental Law; 
 Distributing a Rights of Nature Tribunal Toolkit and increasing the reach of ELC's Co-Violations Report through infographics, social media and other outreach campaigns;
 Establishing global partnerships to launch rights of nature legal initiatives; and
 Expanding educational programs internationally.

Leadership 

Earth Law Center is led by Directing Attorney Grant Wilson, working with Ocean Rights Manager Michelle Bender, as well as Law and Policy Lead Greg Naylor and Director of Development Devon Kearney.

Grant Wilson is an attorney who has advanced environmental campaigns in the United States and worldwide: from the 2010 United Nations Climate Change Conference in Cancún to Kenyan National Land Policy work to Deputy Director of Global Catastrophic Risk Institute in the US.  Grant earned a degree in environmental policy from Huxley College of the Environment at Western Washington University, and a J.D. with a certificate in environmental and natural resources law from Lewis & Clark Law School in Portland, Oregon.

Michelle Bender is an environmental law and policy specialist with expertise in ocean and wildlife law, including the Marine Mammal Protection Act and Endangered Species Act. Michelle graduated summa cum laude from Vermont Law School, where she earned a master's degree in environmental law and policy, and holds a B.S. in biology with a marine emphasis from Western Washington University.

Greg Naylor is an attorney and environmental advocate who has worked with NextGen Climate Action and former V.P. Al Gore's Climate Reality Project to educate the public on climate change and the need to protect the rights of nature.

Devon Kearney is a fundraising professional who has spent his career in the service of organizations that defend fundamental rights and advance solutions to pressing social problems.

History

Earth Law Center was first established as the Center for Earth Jurisprudence, Inc. in 2008 to support new “Earth Jurisprudence” programs at law schools, including Barry University School of Law in Orlando, Florida. The organization expanded its mission in 2010 to become Earth Law Center, which now drafts and promotes new laws and policies, as well as law school and other university curricula, that advance the rights of nature.

Partners

Earth Law Center works with coalitions and organizations on rights of nature issues at the local, state, national, and international levels, including the following:

 UN - The United Nations 
 NRDC - The National Resource Defence Council 
 IUCN - The International Union for the Conservation of Nature 
 CELDF - Community Environmental Legal Defense Fund 
 Global Alliance for the Rights of Nature
 Center for Earth Jurisprudence
 Pachamama Alliance
 Bay Area Rights of Nature Alliance
 Wild Law UK
 * Boulder Rights of Nature
 Australian Earth Laws Alliance
 Earth Law Alliance Aotearoa New Zealand
 Eradicating Ecocide

References

External links

Environmental organizations based in New York (state)
Non-profit organizations based in New York City
Environmental organizations based in New York City